Asura serratilinea is a moth of the family Erebidae. It is found in Australia.

References

serratilinea
Moths described in 1940
Moths of Australia